WBZZ may refer to:

WBZZ, a radio station (100.7 FM) licensed to serve New Kensington, Pennsylvania, United States
WQBK-FM, a radio station (105.7 FM) in Malta, New York, United States licensed as WBZZ from 2006 to 2011
WHFS (AM), a radio station (1010 AM) in Seffner, Florida, United States licensed as WBZZ from 2004 to 2006
KDKA-FM, a radio station (93.7 FM) in Pittsburgh, Pennsylvania, United States licensed as WBZZ from 1981 to 2004